The New Zealand Catholic Bishops' Conference (NZCBC) is an episcopal conference of the Catholic Church in New Zealand that gathers the bishops of the country in order to discuss pastoral issues and in general all matters that have to do with the Church. The NZCBC was formed after the Second Vatican Council in the 1960s.

The Conference has a Secretariat located in Wellington, and a number of agencies and offices to assist the bishops in carrying out national level functions. The NZCBC established a Committee for Interfaith Relations to assist them in their interfaith work.

Recent political engagement by New Zealand bishops have included statements issued in relation to: indigenous rights and Treaty of Waitangi settlements; the rights of refugees and migrants; and promoting restorative justice over retributive justice in New Zealand.

See also
 List of New Zealand Catholic bishops

References

External links
 Catholic.org.nz – Official website

Catholic Church in New Zealand
Episcopal conferences